Kabul hospital shooting may refer to: 

March 2017 Kabul attack
May 2020 Afghanistan attacks
2021 Kabul hospital attack